Euro gold and silver commemorative coins are special euro coins minted and issued by member states of the Eurozone. They are minted mainly in gold and silver, although other precious metals are also used on rare occasions. Austria was one of the first twelve countries in the Eurozone to introduce the euro (€), on 1 January 2002. Since then, the Austrian Mint has been minting both normal issues of Austrian euro coins (which are intended for circulation) and commemorative euro coins in gold and silver.

These commemorative coins are legal tender only in Austria, unlike the normal issues of the Austrian euro coins, which are legal tender in every country of the Eurozone. This means that the commemorative coins made of gold and silver cannot be used as money in other countries. Furthermore, as their bullion value generally exceeds their face value, these coins are not intended to be used as means of payment at all—although this remains possible where they are also legal tender. For this reason, they are usually named Collectors' coins.

Such coins usually commemorate the anniversaries of historical events. They can also draw attention to current events of special importance. Austria mints more than ten of these coins on average per year, in gold, silver and niobium, with face values ranging from €1.50 to €100 (though, as an exceptional case, 15 coins with face value €100,000 were minted in 2004).

Summary 

As of 3 July 2008, eighty variations of Austrian commemorative coins have been minted: eleven in 2002, twelve in 2003, fourteen in 2004, thirteen in 2005, thirteen in 2006, nine in 2007 and eleven to date in 2008. These special high-value commemorative coins are not to be confused with €2 commemorative coins, which are coins designated for circulation and have legal-tender status in all countries of the Eurozone.

The following table shows the number of coins minted per year. In the first section, the coins are grouped by the metal used, while in the second section they are grouped by their face value.

Vienna Philharmonic Coin

2002 coinage

2003 coinage

2004 coinage

2005 coinage

2006 coinage

2007 coinage

2008 coinage

2008 Europe Taler

2009 Coinage 

The following is the schedule for next year issues.

Notes

References 

 

Austria
Currencies of Austria